The 2018 FIBA U20 Women's European Championship Division B was the 14th edition of the Division B of the Women's European basketball championship for national under-20 teams. It was held in Oradea, Romania, from 7 to 15 July 2018. The Czech Republic women's national under-20 basketball team won the tournament.

Participating teams

  (14th place, 2017 FIBA U20 Women's European Championship Division A)

  (15th place, 2017 FIBA U20 Women's European Championship Division A)

First round

Group A

Group B

9th–12th place playoffs

5th–8th place playoffs

Championship playoffs

Final standings

References

External links
FIBA official website

2018
2018–19 in European women's basketball
International youth basketball competitions hosted by Romania
International women's basketball competitions hosted by Romania
Sport in Oradea
FIBA U20
July 2018 sports events in Europe